Ivan Yermachenka (last name also transcribed commonly as John Ermachenko), May 13, 1894 - February 25, 1970) was a Belarusian politician, diplomat and writer.

Life 
Ivan Yermachenka was born into a peasant family near Barysau. In 1914 he graduated from a Russian under-officer school. He fought during World War I; by the end of it he reached the rank of polkovnik (colonel). During the Russian Civil War of 1917-1922 Yermachenka fought for the anticommunist White army and served as adjutant to General Pyotr Vrangel. In 1920 he emigrated to Turkey, where he joined the Belarusian national movement.

In 1921 Yermachenka was appointed ambassador of the Belarusian Democratic Republic in Istanbul and general consul for the Balkans. He established Belarusian consulate missions in Bulgaria and in Yugoslavia.

In 1922 he was appointed deputy foreign minister of the democratic Belarusian government in exile in Kaunas. He then moved to Prague where in 1929 he graduated from the Medical Faculty of Charles University.

From 1938 Ivan Yermachenka worked on cooperation between the Belarusian exiled government and Nazi Germany. On 20 April 1939 Yermachenka sent together with Vasil Zacharka, the president of the Belarusian Democratic Republic in exile, a seventeen-page memorandum to Adolf Hitler personally asking him to take into account the interests of Belarus in any future developments.  In October 1941 Yermachenka travelled to German-occupied Minsk to set up Belarusian Self-Help, the only legal Belarusian organization at that time. He later became advisor to Wilhelm Kube, the German Generalkommissar of Belarus.

In the spring of 1943 Yermachenka was dismissed from all his posts as a result of an operation of the SS and the German police against Kube. On April 27, 1943 he was expelled to Prague where the Gestapo arrested him in relation to the September 1943 assassination of Kube. In early 1945 Yermachenka went to Germany.

In 1948 Yermachenka emigrated to the US, where he worked as doctor. He co-founded the United Belarusian-American Help Committee in South River, New Jersey and became an active member of the Belarusian community in the United States.

He died in Binghamton, New York in 1970.

References

1894 births
1970 deaths
People from Barysaw District
People from Borisovsky Uyezd
Belarusian politicians
Belarusian diplomats
Russian military personnel of World War I
Belarusian people of World War I
Belarusian military personnel
White movement people
People of the Russian Civil War
Charles University alumni
Belarusian collaborators with Nazi Germany
White Russian emigrants to Lithuania
Soviet emigrants to the United States
Belarusian expatriates in the Czech Republic
White Russian emigrants to Czechoslovakia
Ambassadors of Belarus to Turkey